Galaxius may refer to:

Epithet of Apollo in Boeotia, derived from a stream Galaxius
Galaxius Mons on planet Mars